Zawia Media is Afghanistan's first Digital Media platform that was launched in January 2019 in Afghanistan. The sub-sections Zawia News, Zawia Music, and Zawia Cartoons were also later launched under the parent company, Zawia Media. The platforms' slogan is, 'untold realities from a fresh perspective', and the company has attracted a huge fanbase in its currently short life.

Zawia News, one of the company's sub-sections was recently suspended by the Taliban in Afghanistan, an action that was internationally condemned. Currently, the company operates under a .com domain, accessible to everyone in Afghanistan and abroad.

References

External links
 

Television in Afghanistan
Mass media in Afghanistan
Mass media in Kabul
Pashto-language websites